The Lightweight class is an event on the boxing at the 2010 Commonwealth Games competition. Lightweights were limited to those boxers weighing less than 60 kilograms (132.28 lbs).

34 boxers competed, this is the largest amount of entries in any weight class.

Like all Olympic boxing events, the competition was a straight single-elimination tournament. Both semifinal losers were awarded bronze medals, so no boxers compete again after their first loss. Bouts consisted of three rounds of three minutes each, with one-minute breaks between rounds. Punches scored only if the front of the glove made full contact with the front of the head or torso of the opponent. Five judges scored each bout; three of the judges had to signal a scoring punch within one second for the punch to score. The winner of the bout was the boxer who scored the most valid punches by the end of the bout.

Medalists

Tournament

Finals

Top Half

Bottom Half

References

Boxing at the 2010 Commonwealth Games